The year 2009 saw the release of many films. Seven made the top 50 list of highest-grossing films. Also in 2009, the Academy of Motion Picture Arts and Sciences announced that as of that year, their Best Picture category would consist of ten nominees, rather than five (the first time since the 1943 awards).

Evaluation of the year
Film critic Philip French of The Guardian said that 2009 "began with the usual flurry of serious major movies given late December screenings in Los Angeles to qualify for the Oscars. They're now forgotten or vaguely regarded as semi-classics: The Reader, Che, Slumdog Millionaire, Frost/Nixon, Revolutionary Road, The Wrestler, Gran Torino, The Curious Case of Benjamin Button. It soon became apparent that horror movies would be the dominant genre once again, with vampires the pre-eminent sub-species, the most profitable inevitably being New Moon, the latest in Stephenie Meyer's Twilight saga, the best the subtle Swedish Let the Right One In and the worst the British horror spoof Lesbian Vampire Killers. Documentaries continued to flourish, introducing us to fascinating new worlds: Afghan TV talent shows (Afghan Star), Australian exploitation cinema (Not Quite Hollywood), haute couture (The September Issue). Animation thrived, the 3-D comeback threatened to become permanent rather than a gimmick, and the two were conjoined in a dozen 3-D animated features, the finest being Pixar's Up. Remakes and sequels abounded, none of any merit. The same went for films based on comic strips and graphic novels. British cinema generally bubbled in the doldrums. The well-acted Fish Tank was overrated, as was the dull costume drama The Young Victoria. The best films by native directors were fuelled by our obsession with soccer (Ken Loach's Looking for Eric and Tom Hooper's The Damned United) or directed by foreigners (New Zealander Jane Campion's Bright Star, and two films by Danes: Nicholas Winding Refn's Bronson and Lone Scherfig's An Education). The most original British film was Christine Molloy and Joe Lawlor's low-key, low-budget Helen, a formally innovative look at provincial life. 2009 was a mostly undistinguished year for Hollywood, with indifferent films from Woody Allen (Vicky Cristina Barcelona), Michael Mann (Public Enemies) and others, and deadly blockbusters such as Angels & Demons and 2012. The Coen brothers, however, were on form, examining their midwestern Jewish roots in A Serious Man, and Kathryn Bigelow's The Hurt Locker was the best film yet about Iraq. From Europe we had several striking revisionist accounts of violent resistance to Nazi occupation in the second world war: Flammen & Citronen (Denmark), Max Manus: Man of War (Norway) and The Army of Crime (France). But they were drowned in the tsunami of Quentin Tarantino's lunatic second world war fantasy Inglourious Basterds. The most likable European picture was the Italian Mid-August Lunch, the directorial debut of 60-year-old Gianni Di Gregorio (screenwriter on Gomorrah), and the three most memorably argumentative and provocative were Paolo Sorrentino's Il Divo, Lars von Trier's Antichrist and Michael Haneke's The White Ribbon. The performances I most enjoyed were impersonations: Meryl Streep's Julia Child (Julie & Julia) and Christian McKay's Orson in Me and Orson Welles."

Highest-grossing films

The top 10 films released in 2009 by worldwide gross are as follows:

Avatar surpassed Titanic as the highest-grossing film of all time on January 25, 2010. Avatar then became the first film to earn more than $2 billion at the box office on January 31, 2010. Avatar was surpassed by Avengers: Endgame as the highest-grossing film of all time on July 21, 2019. Due to a re-release, Avatar retook the title from Endgame on March 13, 2021.

Events

Awards

2009 films 
The list of films released in 2009, arranged by country, are as follows:
 American films
 Argentine films
 Australian films
 Bengali films
 Bollywood films
 Brazilian films
 British films
 French films
 Hong Kong films
 Italian films
 Japanese films
 List of Kannada films of 2009
 Mexican films
 Malayalam films
 Pakistani films
 Russian films
 South Korean films
 Spanish films
 Tamil films
 Telugu films

Births
January 23 - Winslow Fegley, American actor
January 26 - YaYa Gosselin, American actress
April 15 - Julia Butters, American actress
May 18 - Hala Finley, American actress
June 23 - Xia Vigor, British-Filipino actress

Deaths

Film debuts
 Chris Colfer- Russel Fish: The Sausage and Eggs Incident
 Gal Gadot – Fast & Furious
 Chris Hemsworth – Star Trek
 Nick Jonas – Night at the Museum: Battle of the Smithsonian
 Ellie Kemper – Mystery Team
 Gabby Sidibe – Precious
 Dan Stevens – Hilde

References

External links
 2009 release schedule at Box Office Mojo

 
Film by year